Steffen Wink (born 5 July 1967) is a German actor. He has appeared in more than seventy films since 1991.

Selected filmography

References

External links
 
 

1967 births
Living people
People from Pirmasens
German male film actors
German male television actors